The Roman Catholic Diocese of Kengtung (Lat: Diocesis Kengtunghensis) is a diocese of the Latin Church of the Roman Catholic Church in Burma.

Erected in 1927 as the Apostolic Prefecture of Kengtung, the prefecture was created from territory in the Apostolic Vicariate of Eastern Burma.

In 1950, the Prefecture was elevated to an apostolic vicariate. In 1955, the vicariate was elevated to a full diocese and became suffragan to the Archdiocese of Taunggyi.

With the increases in the Catholic population, in 1975 the apostolic prefecture of Lashio was split off from the diocese of Kengtung, eventually expanding to the Diocese of Lashio.

Ordinaries
Erminio Bonetta, P.I.M.E. † (21 Jun 1927 Appointed – 1949 Died)
Ferdinand Guercilena, P.I.M.E. † (31 May 1950 Appointed – 6 May 1973 Died)
Abraham Than (19 Sep 1972 Appointed – 2 Oct 2001 Resigned)
Peter Louis Cakü † (2 Oct 2001 Appointed – 20 Feb 2020 Died)
John Saw Yaw Han (4 Nov 2022 Appointed – present)

See also
Catholic Church in Burma
Clement Vismara (1897–1988), missionary

Kengtung
Kengtung
Christian organizations established in 1927
Roman Catholic dioceses and prelatures established in the 20th century
1927 establishments in Burma